Raymond C. Johnson (August 20, 1936 - October 8, 1979) was a member of the Wisconsin State Senate.

Biography
Johnson was born on August 20, 1936. He would graduate from what is now the University of Wisconsin-Eau Claire and George Washington University and serve in the United States Navy.

Political career
Johnson was first elected to the Senate in 1966. Later, he would become Majority Leader. He was a Republican.

References

Republican Party Wisconsin state senators
Military personnel from Wisconsin
United States Navy sailors
University of Wisconsin–Eau Claire alumni
George Washington University alumni
1936 births
1979 deaths
20th-century American politicians